The 1995 FIBA Europe Under-16 Championship (known at that time as 1995 European Championship for Cadets) was the 13th edition of the FIBA Europe Under-16 Championship. The cities of Setúbal, Seixal and Almada, in Portugal, hosted the tournament. Croatia won the trophy for the first time.

Teams

Qualification

There were two qualifying rounds for this tournament. Twenty-five national teams entered the qualifying round. Fifteen teams advanced to the Challenge Round, where they joined Russia, Lithuania and Turkey. The remaining eighteen teams were allocated in three groups of six teams each. The three top teams of each group joined Greece (title holder), Spain (runner-up) and Portugal (host) in the final tournament.

Preliminary round
The twelve teams were allocated in two groups of six teams each.

Group A

Group B

Knockout stage

9th–12th playoffs

5th–8th playoffs

Championship

Final standings

References
FIBA Archive
FIBA Europe Archive

1995
Under-16 Championship
FIBA Europe Under-16 Championship
FIBA Europe Under-16 Championship, 1995